Misunderstanding may refer to:
 A mistaken or incorrect understanding
 "Misunderstanding" (Genesis song)
 "Misunderstanding" (Al B. Sure! song)
 "Misunderstandings", an episode of As Time Goes By
 "The Misunderstanding", a song by Orchestral Manoeuvres in the Dark from the album Organisation
 Major Misunderstanding, a character in the British adult comic Viz